Ministry of Health of the Republic of Poland is one of the Ministries of the Republic of Poland. Its current minister is Adam Niedzielski.

Headquarters

Pac Palace in Warsaw was rebuilt in 1948-1951 according to the design of Czesław Konopka and Henryk Białobrzeski, with the elevation from the courtyard being rebuilt according to the design of Marconi, and the garden elevation according to the modified original Baroque design of Tylman of Gameren. It is currently the seat of the Ministry of Health.

Management 
 Adam Niedzielski – minister of health since August 26, 2020
 Waldemar Kraska (PiS) – Secretary of State (Poland) since 1 August 2019
 Maciej Miłkowski – Undersecretary of State since June 18, 2018
 Piotr Bromber – Undersecretary of State since September 13, 2021
 Marcin Martyniak – Undersecretary of State since April 7, 2022
 Blanka Wiśniewska – general director

Air Ambulance
Lotnicze Pogotowie Ratunkowe is an air ambulance service subordinate to the Ministry of Health of Poland. Its fleet includes 27 EC135 helicopters, and 2 Piaggio P.180 Avanti fixed wing airplanes, which operate out of 22 locations throughout Poland.

List of ministers

Ministry of Health (1918–1923)

 Witold Chodźko (1918; 1918–1919; 1920–1923)
 Tomasz Janiszewski (1919–1920)
 Jerzy Bujalski (1923)

Ministry of Labour, Welfare and Health (1944–1945)
 Bolesław Drobner (21 July 1944 – 31 December 1944)
 Wiktor Trojanowski (31 December 1944 – 11 April 1945)

Ministry of Health (1945–1960)
 Franciszek Litwin (11 April 1945 – 5 February 1947)
 Tadeusz Michejda (6 February 1947 – 10 January 1951)
 Jerzy Sztachelski (10 January 1951 – 13 November 1956)
 Rajmund Barański (13 November 1956 – 13 June 1960)

Ministry of Health and Welfare (1960–1999)
 Rajmund Barański (13 June 1960 – May 1961)
 Jerzy Sztachelski (18 May 1961 – 15 July 1968)
 Jan Karol Kostrzewski (15 July 1968 – March 1972)
 Marian Śliwiński (29 March 1972 – 21 November 1980)
 Tadeusz Szelachowski (21 November 1980 – 22 October 1985)
 Mirosław Cybulko (12 November 1985 – 23 October 1987)
 Janusz Komender (23 October 1987 – 19 September 1988)
 Izabela Płaneta-Małecka (14 October 1988 – 1 August 1989)
 Andrzej Kosiniak-Kamysz (12 September 1989 – 14 December 1990)
 Władysław Sidorowicz (12 January 1991 – 5 December 1991)
 Marian Miśkiewicz (23 December 1991 – 5 June 1992)
 Andrzej Wojtyła (11 July 1992 –  26 October 1993)
 Jacek Żochowski (26 October 1993 – 17 September 1997)
 Wojciech Maksymowicz (31 October 1997 –  26 March 1999)
 Franciszka Cegielska (26 March 1999 – 19 October 1999)

Ministry of Health (1999–present)
 Franciszka Cegielska (19 October 1999 – 22 October 2000)
 Grzegorz Opala (2 November 2000 – 19 October 2001)
 Mariusz Łapiński (19 October 2001 – 18 January 2003)
 Marek Balicki (18 January 2003 – 2 April 2003)
 Leszek Sikorski (2 April 2003 – 2 May 2004)
 Wojciech Rudnicki	(2 May 2004 – 19 May 2004)
 Jerzy Hausner (acting; 19 May 2004 – 11 June 2004)
 Marian Czakański	(11 June 2004 – 15 July 2004)
 Marek Balicki (15 July 2004 – 31 October 2005)
 Zbigniew Religa (31 October 2005 – 7 September 2007)
 Jarosław Kaczyński (acting; 7 September 2007 – 10 September 2007)
 Zbigniew Religa (31 October 2005 – 16 November 2007)
 Ewa Kopacz (10 September 2007 – 7 November 2011)
 Donald Tusk (acting; 8 November 2011 – 18 November 2011)
 Bartosz Arłukowicz (18 November 2011 – 10 June 2015)
 Marian Zembala (15 June – 16 November 2015)
 Konstanty Radziwiłł (16 November 2015 – 9 January 2018)
 Łukasz Szumowski (9 January 2018 — 20 August 2020)
 Adam Niedzielski (since 26 August 2020)

See also
 Ministries of Poland
 Health care in Poland

External links
Homepage

Poland
Health
Poland, Health